The Kohinoor Theatre is a mobile theatre group of the North-Eastern Indian state of Assam, founded by Sri Ratan Lahkar in 1976.
Kohinoor Theatre has performed dramas based on Indian, Assamese culture and some works of Shakespeare. The theatre also brought the Atlantic ocean on stage by performing the movie Titanic.

Kohinoor Theatre is the only Assamese mobile theatre group that has performed at New Delhi, Assam. The National School of Drama (NSD) invited the troupe to perform in New Delhi in the year 2010 for 3 days from 25 to 29 April.

List of plays
List of Plays from 35th season (2010-11) is listed below

References 

Theatre companies in India
Organisations based in Assam
Culture of Assam
1976 establishments in Assam